Lavrentiy is a Russian masculine given name.

Lavrentiy Beria, Soviet politician
Lavrentiy Tsanava, Soviet politician

See also 
Lavrenti (given name)
Lavrentis (name)
Laurentius (disambiguation)

Russian masculine given names